A stint is one of several very small waders in the paraphyletic "Calidris" assemblage – often separated in Erolia – which in North America are known as peeps. They are scolopacid waders much similar in ecomorphology to their distant relatives, the charadriid plovers.

Some of these birds are difficult to identify because of the similarity between species, and various breeding, non-breeding, juvenile, and moulting plumages. In addition, some plovers are also similarly patterned, especially in winter. With a few exceptions, stints usually have a fairly stereotypical color pattern, being brownish above and lighter – usually white – on much of the underside. They often have a lighter supercilium above brownish cheeks.


Systematics and taxonomy
The genus Calidris is not monophyletic in its traditional delimitations and should be restricted to the stout red knot and its allies. The genus Erolia was often used for the stints ever since it was proposed by Louis Jean Pierre Vieillot in 1816. However, the type species of Erolia is the curlew sandpiper, which is not traditionally included among the stints.

No firm consensus has been reached on the curlew sandpiper's phylogenetic status (i.e., what its closest relatives are) and hence Erolia cannot be exactly delimited at present. This notwithstanding, the stints together with a few slightly more distinct calidrids would indeed warrant separation as a distinct genus. The sanderling, sometimes placed in Crocethia, is among these and it may be that this genus name would apply.

The species usually considered stints/peeps are:
 Semipalmated sandpiper, Calidris pusilla or Erolia pusilla
 Western sandpiper, Calidris mauri or Erolia mauri
 Red-necked stint, Calidris ruficollis or Erolia ruficollis
 Little stint, Calidris minuta or Erolia minuta
 Temminck's stint, Calidris temminckii or Erolia temminckii
 Long-toed stint, Calidris subminuta or Erolia subminuta
 Least sandpiper, Calidris minutilla or Erolia minutilla
 White-rumped sandpiper, Calidris fuscicollis or Erolia fuscicollis
 Baird's sandpiper, Calidris bairdii or Erolia bairdii

See also
 Hybridisation in shorebirds

Footnotes

References
  (2004): A supertree approach to shorebird phylogeny. BMC Evol. Biol. 4: 28.   PDF fulltext Supplementary Material

Calidris
Bird common names